Pietro Købke Krohn (23 January 1840 – 15 October 1905) was a Danish painter, illustrator, theatre director and museum director. 
He is remembered above all for his work together with Otto Haslund, illustrating Johan Krohn's book  Peters Jul

Early life and education
Born in Copenhagen, Denmark, he was the son of sculptor Frederik Christopher Krohn (1806–1883) and Sophie Susanne Købke (1807–1853). His younger brother was author Johan Jacob Krohn (1841–1925).

Krohn studied painting at the Royal Danish Academy of Fine Arts under Wilhelm Marstrand, Jørgen Roed and P.C. Skovgaard (1860–67). In 1871, together with Otto Haslund and Julius Lange, he traveled to Germany and the Netherlands to familiarize himself with the latest reproduction techniques. In the mid-1870s, he became a member of the Danish artists colony in Rome, associating with Thorvald Bindesbøll, Hans Friis, Axel Helsted, Carl Thomsen and Kristian Zahrtmann.

Career
Krohn illustrated a number of children's books written by his brother Johan Jacob Krohn  including Peters Jul (1866), Billedbog for Børn (1871) and Børnehistorier (1872).
Despite further attempts to improve his painting, for example in Paris in 1978, he became more generally interested in all forms of art. From 1880 to 1893, he became a costume designer at the Royal Danish Theatre where he also directed operas. He was artistic director of the porcelain factory Bing & Grøndahl from 1885 to 1892 and, from 1893 until his death, head of the Danish Museum of Art & Design (Kunstindustrimuseet).

References

Literature

External links

 
 Marijanne Gelfer-Jørgensen: Pietro Krohn - Danmarks kunstneriske puls

1840 births
1905 deaths
19th-century Danish painters
Danish male painters
19th-century Danish illustrators
20th-century Danish illustrators
Directors of museums in Denmark
Danish theatre directors
Artists from Copenhagen
Royal Danish Academy of Fine Arts alumni
19th-century Danish male artists